Zachary John Mesday (born October 25, 1994) is an American football rookie free agent defensive end/linebacker from Trenton, New Jersey who played college football for Temple University, where he originally walked-on and eventually earned a sixth year of eligibility and scholarship as a graduate student.

Early years
Mesday was a defensive end, tight end and fullback at Nottingham High School in New Jersey, where he was a member of the 2012 CJ Group III state title-winning team. He earned third-team All-State, first-team All-State Group III, first-team All South Jersey, first-team all-conference (7A)/county, New Jersey Super 100 All-State Team, conference lineman of the year, and four-time player of the week for Mercer County in his senior year. That season he recorded 106 tackles, 19.5 sacks, two interceptions, and six forced fumbles.

After receiving "a few D-II and I-AA offers but nothing with a full scholarship," he prepped a year and switched positions to linebacker as a postgraduate at the Canterbury School in New Milford, Connecticut.

College years
Mesday went to Temple as a preferred-walk-on with a chance to compete for a scholarship in 2014 and redshirted as a true freshman. In 2015 and 2016 he redshirted while recovering from knee surgeries. From 2014 to 2018 he was awarded named Athletic Director's Honor Roll five times. He saw his game first action in 2017. As a graduate in 2018 he finished third on the team in tackles for loss (8.0) and was named American Athletic Conference All-Academic Team. He was granted a sixth year of eligibility and as a graduate in 2019 he was named William Campbell Trophy semifinalist and to the American Football Coaches Association Good Works Team Watch List.

In 2020, Mesday was named to the National Football Foundation & College Hall of Fame Hampshire Honor Society, to which players are named for maintaining a cumulative 3.2 GPA or better throughout their college careers.

Career stats

References

External links 
 Temple Owls Profile

1994 births
Living people
American football linebackers
Canterbury School (Connecticut) alumni
People from Hamilton Township, Mercer County, New Jersey
Players of American football from Trenton, New Jersey